Santa María de Mingre Airport  is an airport in the western Maule Region of Chile.

The runway length does not include an additional  of unpaved overrun on each end of the runway. There is distant rising terrain in all quadrants.

See also

Transport in Chile
List of airports in Chile

References

External links
OpenStreetMap - Santa María de Mingre
OurAirports - Santa María de Mingre
FallingRain - Santa María de Mingre Airport

Airports in Chile
Airports in Maule Region